D. DoRohn Gough (born March 22, 1978 in Detroit, Michigan) is an American Music Producer, Music Executive, songwriter, composer, arranger and entrepreneur. Now serving as president & C.E.O. of DOROHN ENTERTAINMENT LLC, (which was founded by his father David L. Gough in 1978), DoRohn has produced singles for a number of artists in a variety of genres ranging from R&B/Hip-Hop, Pop, & Gospel. From 2008 to present he has had his most commercial success to date with Compound Entertainment artist "Ne-Yo", with the production of the smash hit "Champagne Life."

Biography
As a young child DoRohn was surrounded by music and grew up in a talented musical family. Born and raised in Detroit, Michigan, the son of David Gough, founder of the "International Gospel Music Hall of Fame and Museum".

Music 
DoRohn received classical and jazz training at the Center for Creative Studies and Performing Arts and went on to study music at Eastern Michigan University. 

During that time DoRohn was blessed to meet Kern & Valdez Brantley, (musical directors for Lady Gaga and Usher) and they became his musical mentors. 

After college DoRohn remained committed to his gospel roots and began working with gospel music artist Dorinda Clark-Cole. He was soon recruited to play the keyboards for the 2006 "Up-close and Personal Tour" featuring Chris Brown and Ne-Yo tour. 

During that tour Ne-Yo discovered DoRohn’s song writing ability and signed him to a production deal to Compound Entertainment. Though that deal DoRohn produced the hit "Then There’s You" for Day 26 and the smash hit "Can’t be Good" for Janet Jackson on her "Discipline" album. But the best was yet to come. 

Ne-Yo selected DoRohn to produce several songs for his upcoming album Libra Scale. 

A rare feat for any new producer as Ne-Yo has mainly worked with the production team Stargate, an entity DoRohn’s production style has often been compared to.  

DoRohn worked diligently and came to produce two records for the Libra Scale album, "What Have I Done?" and the track for the hit single Champagne Life.

Discography 
 2008: "Can't Be Good"    (Janet Jackson - Discipline)
 2009: "Then There's You" (Day 26 - Forever in a Day)
 2010: "Champagne Life"   (Ne-Yo - Libra Scale)
 2010: "What Have I Done?" (Ne-Yo - Libra Scale)
 2012: "Champagne Life" (Gerald Albright & Norman Brown "24/7")
 2014: "Don't Say Good Bye" (Kem ft. L. Renee "Promis To Love Deluxe Edition"
 2020: "His Love" (The Clark Sisters Ft. Snoop Dogg "The Return Deluxe Edition"
 2021: "Trouble Don't Last Always" (D'Shondra Ft. Kirk Franklin - "D'SHONDRA EP")

References

Living people
1978 births